Angel of Mercy is a 1993 Slovak drama film directed by Miloslav Luther. The film was selected as the Slovak entry for the Best Foreign Language Film at the 67th Academy Awards, but was not accepted as a nominee.

Cast
 Ingrid Timková as Anezka
 Juraj Simko as Krystof
 Josef Vajnar as Horecky
 Peter Simun as Fero
 Juraj Mokrý as Sylvio
 Marta Sládecková as Hilda

See also
 List of submissions to the 67th Academy Awards for Best Foreign Language Film
 List of Slovak submissions for the Academy Award for Best Foreign Language Film

References

External links
 

1993 films
1993 drama films
1990s Czech-language films
Slovak drama films